The Murchison Award, also referred to as the Murchison Grant, was first given by the Royal Geographical Society in 1882 for publications judged to have contributed most to geographical science in preceding recent years.

Recipients
Source (1882–1982): British Museum
Source (1970 onwards) Royal Geographical Society

See also

 List of geography awards

References

External links 
Royal Geographical Society

Awards of Royal Geographical Society
Awards established in 1882